Donizetti is an Italian surname. It may refer to:
Gaetano Donizetti, (1797–1848), Italian composer
Giuseppe Donizetti (1788–1856), Instructor General of the Imperial Ottoman Music
Mario Donizetti (born 1932), Italian painter
Sérgio Luís Donizetti, known as João Paulo, (born 1964) Brazilian footballer
Armelino Donizetti Quagliato, known as Zetti, (born 1965) Brazilian footballer
Aparecido Donizetti, (born 1973), Brazilian footballer

Buildings
Teatro Donizetti, opera

Other
9912 Donizetti, asteroid
Italian ship Gaetano Donizetti, sunk in September 1943, killing 1,800 Italian POW's

Italian-language surnames